Gaskill–Erwin Farm is a historic home and farm located in Tippecanoe Township, Marshall County, Indiana.  The farmhouse was built in 1879, and is a two-story, five bay, Italianate style frame dwelling.  It sits on a granite fieldstone foundation and is sheathed in clapboard siding.  It features a front porch with mansard roof and decorative brackets.  Also on the property are the contributing original Gaskill House (c. 1860) converted to a storage building about 1910 and the Erwin seed corn drying house (c. 1935).

It was listed on the National Register of Historic Places in 2015.

References

Farms on the National Register of Historic Places in Indiana
Italianate architecture in Indiana
Houses completed in 1879
Buildings and structures in Marshall County, Indiana
National Register of Historic Places in Marshall County, Indiana